Now and Then is the thirty-fifth studio album by American country music singer Conway Twitty. The album was released in 1976, by MCA Records.

Track listing

Charts

References

1976 albums
Conway Twitty albums
MCA Records albums
Albums produced by Owen Bradley